Tochimilco (municipality) is one of 217 municipalities in Puebla in south-eastern Mexico.  The municipal seat is the town of Tochimilco.

References

Municipalities of Puebla
Nahua settlements